Brian Eduardo Navarreto (born December 29, 1994) is a Puerto Rican professional baseball catcher in the Milwaukee Brewers organization. He previously played in Major League Baseball (MLB) for the Miami Marlins in 2020.

Career
Navarreto began playing baseball as a catcher in Little League baseball in Bayamón, Puerto Rico. He attended Arlington Country Day School in Jacksonville, Florida.

Minnesota Twins
The Minnesota Twins selected Navarreto in the sixth round of the 2013 MLB draft. From 2013 to 2017 in the Twins organization, Navarreto spent time with the GCL Twins, Elizabethton Twins, Cedar Rapids Kernels, Fort Myers Miracle, Chattanooga Lookouts, and Pensacola Blue Wahoos. Navarreto was invited to Spring Training with the Twins in 2018 and 2019, but did not make the team either year and spent both seasons in Pensacola.

New York Yankees
On July 25, 2019, Navarreto was traded to the New York Yankees in exchange for cash considerations. At the time of his trade, Navarreto had hit .215/.265/.308 in his minor league career, but also carried a strong 47% caught stealing rate. Navarreto was assigned to the Double-A Trenton Thunder, and would finish out the season there. On November 4, 2019, Navarreto elected free agency.

Miami Marlins
On December 18, 2019, Navarreto signed a minor league contract with the Miami Marlins. The Marlins promoted him to the major leagues on August 23, 2020. He made his major league debut that day as the starting catcher versus the Washington Nationals. On August 29, 2020, Navarreto was designated for assignment by the Marlins. To begin the 2021 season, Navarreto was assigned to the Jacksonville Jumbo Shrimp of Triple-A East. Navarreto played in 58 games between three Marlins affiliates in 2021: Jacksonville, the Double-A Pensacola Blue Wahoos, and the Single-A Jupiter Hammerheads. With the three teams, Navarreto hit .214/.275/.406 with 9 home runs and 26 RBI. He elected free agency following the season on November 7, 2021.

Milwaukee Brewers
Prior to the 2022 season, Navarreto signed with the York Revolution of the Atlantic League of Professional Baseball. However, before the start of the ALPB season, on March 15, 2022, Navarreto signed a minor league contract with the Milwaukee Brewers organization.

References

External links

Living people
1994 births
Major League Baseball players from Puerto Rico
Major League Baseball catchers
Miami Marlins players
Gulf Coast Twins players
Elizabethton Twins players
Cedar Rapids Kernels players
Fort Myers Miracle players
Chattanooga Lookouts players
Gigantes de Carolina players
Sportspeople from Bayamón, Puerto Rico
Tigres del Licey players
Trenton Thunder players
Pensacola Blue Wahoos players
Jacksonville Jumbo Shrimp players
Indios de Mayagüez players
Jupiter Hammerheads players
Carolina Mudcats players
Nashville Sounds players
Puerto Rican expatriate baseball players in the Dominican Republic
Toros del Este players